The 2015 FIA R-GT Cup was the first edition of the FIA rally cup for GT cars in Group R-GT. The cup was contested over 5 tarmac rounds from the World and European rally championships.

The championship was won by François Delecour in a Tuthill-prepared Porsche 997, winning two rallies – in Monte Carlo and Corsica – and finishing in second place in Ypres and Germany. With 86 points, Delecour scored exactly double the tally of second-placed driver Romain Dumas, who won in Germany and finished second to Delecour in Monte Carlo. Third place in the championship went to Marc Duez, who finished third on both events he contested – Monte Carlo and Ypres – while Patrick Snijers won his only event, in Ypres.

Calendar

The calendar for the 2015 season featured five tarmac rallies: the three tarmac rounds from the WRC and two selected rounds from the ERC.

Entries

Results

Notes
  – The Monte Carlo Rally was shortened, as overcrowding caused the ninth stage to be cancelled for safety reasons.
  – The Tour de Corse was shortened after flooding damaged roads on the Casamozza–Ponte Leccia stage. Both runs through the stage were cancelled.

Standings
Points are awarded to the top ten classified finishers.

Source:

FIA R-GT Cup for Drivers

References

FIA R-GT Cup
R-GT Cup